Christer Strömholm (July 22, 1918 – January 11, 2002), also known by the pseudonym Christer Christian, was a Swedish photographer and educator. He is known for his intimate black and white street photography portrait series, particularly his portraits of transgender women in Paris. Strömholm received the 1997 Hasselblad Award.

Life and career
Strömholm was born in Vaxholm, Sweden, to Lizzie Strömholm and Fredrik Strömholm, an army officer. His childhood was marked by family instability. The family moved frequently, and in 1924 his parents divorced, but remarried shortly thereafter. In 1934, Strömholm's father committed suicide.

Beginning in 1933, Strömholm was active in the Nazi Nordic Youth movement, modelled after Hitler Youth. He led one of its cells during this time, and in 1936 hoisted a flag of a swastika on the People's House in Stockholm. Over the course of his young adulthood, however, his political perspective changed; he joined the Swedish Volunteer Corps at the age of 21, and supported the Norwegian resistance movement later in the war.

In 1937 Strömholm travelled to Dresden to study art under the German painter . However, he came into conflict with Paul Klee and other Bauhaus artists, and his stay in Dresden was brief.

Strömholm was a member of Otto Steinert's Fotoform group of photographers for subjective photography. He co-founded Fotoskolan academy in Stockholm in 1962 and was its director. Alumni of the school include production designer Anna Asp, cinematographer Bille August, and photographers Anders Petersen, Björn Dawidsson (Dawid), and Gunnar Smoliansky. He is  noted for his depictions of transsexual women in the Place Blanche area of 1950-1960s' Paris, published as Les amies de Place Blanche. The critic Sean O'Hagan, writing in The Guardian, said he "is known as the father of Swedish photography both for his abiding influence and for his role as a teacher."

In 1998 Strömholm received the 1997 Hasselblad Award. The award citation described him as "one of Scandinavia's leading photographers, and [...] the first post-war photographer to gain international renown".

Books
 Poste Restante. P. A. Norstedt & Söners Förlag, 1967. With a transcript of an interview with Strömholm, "Before the Photographs." Swedish-language edition.
Stockholm: Art & Theory, 2016. . With a transcript of an interview with Strömholm, "Before the Photographs." English-language edition.
 Les Amies de Place Blanche. ETC Sweden, 1983
 Kloka ord (Wise Words). Legus, 1997. . A collection of aphorisms and work notes.
 Imprints. Hasselblad Center, 1998. 
 Nueve Segundos De Mi Vida. Mexico: Conaculta / Centro de la Imagen, 1999. 
 On Verra Bien. Bildverksamheten Strömholm & Färgfabriken, 2002. 
 Christer Strömholm. Photo Poche. Arles, France: Actes Sud, 2006. 
 Poste Restante. Göttingen, Germany: Steidl, 2011. 
 Les Amies de Place Blanche. Stockport, Cheshire: Dewi Lewis, 2012. ; and Villejuif, France: Aman Iman, 2013. . Re-edited from the original edition.
 Post Scriptum Christer Strömholm. Stockholm: Max Strom, 2013.

Awards
1998: 1997 Hasselblad Award.

Exhibitions
 Les Amies de Place Blanche, International Center for Photography, New York, 2012.

References

External links 
 Christer Strömholm estate website

Note: This article contains content from the Swedish-language edition of Wikipedia

Swedish photographers
1918 births
2002 deaths
Artists from Stockholm
Street photographers